Leah Cairns (born June 2, 1974) is a Canadian actress. She is best known for her roles as Lieutenant Margaret "Racetrack" Edmondson in Battlestar Galactica and as Kathryn McLaren in the TV series "Travelers."

Early life
Cairns was born in North Vancouver, British Columbia, and grew up in Kamloops. Dreams of becoming a professional dancer were dashed when she broke her back in a car accident at 16. When her dance team went to an international competition in her graduating year, rather than sit at home, she decided to visit Costa Rica and then began a backpacking trek that took her to 36 countries and took eight years. Before returning to Canada, she took an improvisation class at an ashram in India.

Career
Cairns appeared in Robson Arms before winning a recurring role as Jenna in Godiva's, for which she received a Leo Award nomination in 2006 for Best Supporting Performance by a Female in a Dramatic Series. Joining the Battlestar cast as Raptor pilot/ECO Racetrack at the end of season one, her performance impressed showrunners and Racetrack became a recurring character for the rest of the show. During BSG's season three Cairns also played Emily Hollander on the ABC Family series Kyle XY and appeared in Sanctuary. On the silver screen, she appeared in 88 Minutes and played Lois in Interstellar. In 2018, she co-starred in the film Diminuendo opposite Richard Hatch, her friend from the BSG reboot.

Cairns had a recurring role as Kathryn "Kat" MacLaren for the 3 seasons (2016–2018) of the series Travelers.

Filmography

Film

Television

External links

1974 births
Canadian film actresses
Canadian television actresses
Living people
People from Kamloops
People from North Vancouver
Actresses from Vancouver
21st-century Canadian actresses